City Impact Church can refer to:

 City Impact Church New Zealand in Auckland, Mt. Wellington, East Coast Bays, Queenstown, Invercargill, Balclutha
 City Impact Church Canada in Moncton, Bathurst, Fredericton
 City Impact Church Tonga in Tonga